Redridge is a locality in the Bundaberg Region, Queensland, Australia.

Geography 
The Gregory River forms the north-eastern boundary of the locality, while Stockyard Creek forms the southern and south-eastern boundaries.

The Goodwood Road passes through the locality from the west (North Isis) to north-east (Goodwood).

A cane tramway enters the locality from the north-west (Farnsfield) and extends towards the south-east of the locality and terminates there. It provides a means to transport harvested sugarcane to the Isis Central sugar mill.

Although most of the land is used for a variety of crop growing (including sugarcane), there is some residential development in the south-west of the locality, mostly rural residential acreage blocks.

Education 
There are no schools in Redridge. The nearest primary schools are in Goodwood and Childers. The nearest secondary school is in Childers.

References 

Bundaberg Region
Localities in Queensland